The Honda Celebration of Light (formerly known as Benson & Hedges Symphony of Fire and The HSBC Celebration of Light) is an annual musical fireworks competition in Vancouver, British Columbia, Canada. The first "Symphony of Fire" was held from July 25 to August 5, 1990. The celebration is one of Vancouver's largest and most well known festivals, and is recognized as the longest running off-shore fireworks competitions in the world.  The multiple-day event has an estimated annual attendance of 1.4 million people.

2023 program

2022 program
The 2022 competition took place on July 23, 27, and 30. The participating countries are Japan, Canada, and Spain. The winner of the 2022 competition was Canada.

2021 program (cancelled)
The event was postponed until July 23, 27, and 30 in 2022 due to the ongoing COVID-19 pandemic in British Columbia.

2020 program (cancelled)

In 2020, the competition was cancelled due to the COVID-19 pandemic in British Columbia.

2019 program
The 2019 Honda Celebration of Light took place on July 27, July 31, and August 3, 2019.  The participating countries were India, Canada, and Croatia.  It was the first year where India and Croatia have participated in the competition. The winner of the 2019 competition was Canada.

2018 program 
The 2018 Honda Celebration of Light took place on July 28, August 1, and August 4.  The participating countries were South Africa, represented by Fireworks for Africa; Sweden, represented by Unique Pyrotechnic; and South Korea, by Daehan Fireworks Co.  For the first time, all three competitors were required to incorporate the same theme into their fireworks display and musical accompaniment.  The theme, which was voted by the public, was love.  The winner was South Korea.

2017 program 
The 2017 Honda Celebration of Light took place on July 29, August 2, and August 5, featuring competitors from Japan, the United Kingdom, and Canada. The competitor for Japan, Akariya, previously won the 2014 Honda Celebration of Light. Widely regarded as the premiere pyrotechnic company in the UK, the multi-award-winning Jubilee Fireworks Ltd became the holders of the first "Champions of Champions" title after winning both national competitions: The British Fireworks Championships and The British Musical Fireworks Championships.  Royal Pyrotechnie, recognized as the most decorated fireworks firm in Canada, is the only group to win three Gold Jupiter awards during the annual L'International des Feux Loto-Québec competition.

To celebrate Canada's 150th anniversary, each of the competitors were required to include one iconic Canadian song into their display, extending the traditional length of the shows (25 minutes) for an additional 3 minutes (for a total of 28 minutes).  The songs were voted by the public on Honda's Celebration of Light Facebook page; the three chosen were "Ahead by a Century" by The Tragically Hip, "Hallelujah" by Leonard Cohen, and "Summer of '69" by Bryan Adams.  The winner of the competition was Japan.

2016 program 
The 2016 Honda Celebration of Light took place on July 23, July 27, and July 30.  The event featured the Netherlands, Australia, and the United States in competition. Notably, 2016 was the first time that the Netherlands has competed in the event. The Walt Disney Company, the world's largest consumer of fireworks, was the competitor for the United States, while Australia was represented by Howard & Sons, whose displays have included the opening and closing ceremonies for 2000 Summer Olympics in Sydney and opening and closing ceremonies for the 2010 Commonwealth Games in Delhi and 2006 Commonwealth Games in Melbourne. Team USA won the competition. Vancouver Police had to shut down English Bay Beach for the Team USA show, due to capacity concerns.

2015 program 
The 2015 Honda Celebration of Light was scheduled for July 25, July 29, and August 1.  For the 25th anniversary of the event, three returning competitors from China, Brazil, and Canada participated. The 2015 competition winner was Canada.

2014 program 
The 2014 Honda Celebration of Light was scheduled for July 26, July 30, and August 2, featuring performances by the United States, France, and Japan respectively.  The competitors were newcomers to Vancouver, though their respective countries have previously participated before.  The 2014 competition winner was Japan.

2013 program 
The 2013 Honda Celebration of Light was scheduled for July 27, July 31, and August 3, with performances by the United Kingdom, Canada, and Thailand respectively.  2013 was the first year that Thailand participated in the event as part of the organizers' ongoing efforts to introduce a new nation to the program each year. The 2013 competition winner was Canada.

2012 program 

The 2012 Honda Celebration of Light saw teams from Vietnam and Brazil as newcomers, while the Italian team of Pirotecnica Soldi was more established.  Canada did not participate for the first time in six years as producers of the event had been looking for new countries to compete from each continent for the next three years.  The 2012 competition winner was Italy.

2011 program 
The 2011 HSBC Celebration of Light presented a "Battle of Champions" by featuring three previous competition winners: China (represented by 2009 winner Red Eagle Industrial and Trade Co. Ltd), Spain (represented by 2010 winner Pirotecnia Igual), and Canada (represented by 2007 and 2008 winner Archangel Fireworks Inc).  The winner for the 2011 competition was China.

2010 program 

The 2010 HSBC Celebration of Light winner was Spain (Pirotecnia Igual).

2009 program 
The 2009 HSBC Celebration of Light winner was China (Red Eagle Industrial and Trade Co. Ltd.).

2008 program 
The 2008 HSBC Celebration of Light winner was Canada, making back-to-back wins for Archangel Fireworks Inc.

2007 program 
The 2007 HSBC Celebration of Light winner was Canada.

2006 program 
The 2006 winner was Mexico, who joined the competition for the first time.

Previous years 

Because of the change in sponsor, records are difficult to find before the year 2001.

2006

2005

2004

2003

2002

2001

2000

1999

1998

1997

1996

1995

1994

1993

1992

1991

1990

References 

City of Vancouver administrative report
tobacco.org: Tobacco firm ends funding of Symphony of Fire

External links 

Official Celebration of Light website
Full video clip of Canada July 23, 2008 fireworks display
Full video clip of USA July 26, 2008 fireworks display
Full video clip of the Finale August 2 2008 fireworks display
Full video clip of Canada July 23, 2009 fireworks display
Celebration of Light - Photo shot from North Vancouver

Festivals in Vancouver
Pyrotechnics
Fireworks in Canada
Annual events in Canada
Fireworks competitions
Summer events in Canada
Light festivals